Kreshchenovka is a rural locality (a selo) in Ivanovsky Selsoviet of Ivanovsky District, Amur Oblast, Russia. The population was 166 as of 2018. There are 3 streets.

Geography 
Kreshchenovka is located 14 km south of Ivanovka (the district's administrative centre) by road. Lozovoye is the nearest rural locality.

References 

Rural localities in Ivanovsky District, Amur Oblast